Richard Paul Davies (born 15 March 1973) is the current Archdeacon of Surrey and former Archdeacon of Bangor.

Davies was educated at the University of Wales, Lampeter, the University of Oxford and Ripon College, Cuddesdon. He was ordained in 1997 in St Davids Cathedral, Pembrokeshire, where he served his title as a minor canon before incumbencies at Solva in Pembrokeshire and Burry Port in Carmarthenshire. He was appointed on 23 September 2011 and collated and installed as Archdeacon of Bangor and Anglesey in Bangor Cathedral on 19 February 2012. At the time of his installation (aged 38), Davies was the youngest archdeacon in Wales and England. Davies was collated Archdeacon of Surrey, in the English Diocese of Guildford, on 10 December 2017.

References

1973 births
Archdeacons of Bangor
Archdeacons of Surrey
Alumni of the University of Wales, Lampeter
Alumni of the University of Oxford
Alumni of Ripon College Cuddesdon
21st-century Welsh Anglican priests
Living people
Alumni of Regent's Park College, Oxford